Nicholas James Yarris (born 1961) is an American writer who spent 22 years on death row in Pennsylvania after being wrongfully convicted of murder.

Prosecution, conviction, and exoneration
Although disputed by some family members, Yarris has stated he was the victim of sexual abuse as a child at the hands of another youth, which led him into addiction to alcohol, drugs and the commission of petty crime in his teens. On December 21, 1981, Yarris and a friend stole a car. Yarris, then age 20, was blasting music while driving under the influence when he was stopped by police in Delaware County, Pennsylvania.
The officer and Yarris got into a physical confrontation, and the policeman's gun discharged. Yarris was charged with the kidnapping and attempted murder of a police officer. He was later tried and acquitted of those charges.

While in jail, facing a possible sentence of life in prison, he spotted a newspaper article about the December 16, 1981, murder and rape of Linda Mae Craig, who had been abducted from a Delaware shopping center but whose body had been found in Pennsylvania. In an effort to win favor with the authorities and avoid the consequences of his pending charges, Yarris claimed that he knew who had committed the unsolved rape-murder. When the man he named, whom he had wrongly believed to be recently deceased, proved upon investigation to be plainly uninvolved, Yarris became the number-one suspect.

Yarris was then charged with the abduction, rape and murder of Craig. After a short jury trial, Yarris was found guilty. In July 1982, at age 21, he was sentenced to death. Yarris escaped from custody while being transported to a post-sentence hearing, but was arrested in Florida about a month later, where he identified himself. Florida authorities agreed to return him to Pennsylvania's death row. Numerous appeals and post-conviction challenges proved unavailing. During his time in prison, Yarris taught himself to read, married a prison volunteer visitor, and became the first death row prisoner to seek DNA testing. In 2003, with the aid of a team of court-appointed lawyers (including Christina Swarns, later to become Executive Director of the national Innocence Project), a third round of DNA testing (following prior inconclusive efforts) proved that two unidentified men, not Yarris, had committed the crime. In January 2004, after clearing the escape-related charges, he was released.

Post-exoneration activities and personal life

Following his exoneration and release, Yarris protested once a week outside the District Attorney's Office, demanding that the DNA samples be submitted to the FBI database to find Craig's real rapists and killers. The next year, he moved to the UK, where Yarris worked with Reprieve, married and had a daughter. Following a divorce, he married his third wife, also from the UK. The couple then moved back to the United States. Following another divorce, Yarris returned to the UK and married for a fourth time, moving from Somerset to Oregon. The couple separated in February 2021. Yarris was arrested roughly a week after. He pled guilty to criminal mistreatment and theft, leading to a month in jail and a sentence of two years' probation in Curry County, Oregon.  

Yarris sued the Delaware County District Attorney's Office in federal court for malicious prosecution, and the case eventually settled for $4 million in 2008. Having failed to make provision for his long-term support from the settlement of the civil case, as of 2021 Yarris was unemployed and living in a trailer in Oregon.

Writings

Yarris is the author of the death row memoir Seven Days to Live (2008) (later reissued as The Fear of 13). He has also published books titled The Kindness Approach (2017), My Journey Through Her Eyes (2017) and Monsters and Madmen (2018) (experiences on death row at the since-decommissioned SCI Pittsburgh).

Film and television coverage

Yarris is one of the exonerees profiled in the award-winning documentary, After Innocence (2005). He is also the subject and protagonist-narrator of David Sington's documentary The Fear of 13 released in 2015. Yarris appeared on The Joe Rogan Experience on September 11, 2018, talking at length about his life story. The Yarris case was explored in a two-part interview for the December 11, 2019 episode (Season 9) of the podcast,Wrongful Conviction with Jason Flom, and was the subject of the June 17, 2019 episode of CNN/HLN's Death Row Stories, "A Prison of His Own" (Season 4, Episode 3).

References 

Living people
Overturned convictions in the United States
Place of birth missing (living people)
American people wrongfully convicted of murder
1961 births
American emigrants to England
Writers from Philadelphia